Korshunikha is a rural locality (a village) in Oktyabrskoye Rural Settlement, Vyaznikovsky District, Vladimir Oblast, Russia. The population was 8 as of 2010.

Geography 
Korshunikha is located 14 km west of Vyazniki (the district's administrative centre) by road. Likhaya Pozhnya is the nearest rural locality.

References 

Rural localities in Vyaznikovsky District